The 1979 Senior League World Series took place from August 14–19 in Gary, Indiana, United States. Taichung, Taiwan defeated Tampa, Florida twice in the championship game. It was Taiwan's eighth straight championship.

Teams

Results

References

Senior League World Series
Senior League World Series
Baseball competitions in Indiana
Sports in Gary, Indiana
1979 in sports in Indiana